Björn Einarsson (born 19 June 1978) is a Swedish Bandy player who currently plays for Vetlanda BK as forward.  Björn has scored over 100 goals in the Allsvenskan.

Björn has only played for two clubs:

External links
Björn Einarsson at Bandysidan
Vetlanda BK Official site

Swedish bandy players
Living people
1978 births
Vetlanda BK players
Hammarby IF Bandy players